Union Sportive Albigeoise is a French association football team founded in 1912. They are based in Albi, Midi-Pyrénées, France and are currently playing in the Championnat de France Amateurs Group C. They play at the Stade Maurice Rigaud in Albi, which has a capacity of 3,000.

Honours 
 Midi-Pyrénées championship : 1960, 1968, 1978, 1992, 1996

Current squad 
As of November 2009.

	

 

  Staff  
 
 GOUGGINSPERG Patrick  (coach)
 
 GUIBBAL Christian  (assistant coach)

 DANIMBE Poupon (Technical Assistant) 
 
 GUILLOT Christian (Technical Assistant) 
 
 KHADEM Ahmad (Technical Assistant) 
 
 CANCE Louis (Technical Assistant)

External links
 US Albi Official website 

1912 establishments in France
Association football clubs established in 1912
Sport in Albi
Football clubs in Occitania (administrative region)